Conus striatus, common name the striated cone, is a species of sea snail, a marine gastropod mollusk in the family Conidae, the cone snails and their allies.

These snails are predatory and venomous. While they are piscivorous (eat fishes), they are capable of "stinging" humans, therefore live ones should be handled carefully or not at all.

Subspecies
 Conus striatus juliaallaryae (Cossignani, 2013) (synonym: Pionoconus striatus juliaallaryae Cossignani, 2013)
 Conus striatus oahuensis (Tucker, Tenorio & Chaney, 2011) (synonym: Pionoconus striatus oahuensis Tucker, Tenorio & Chaney, 2011)
 Conus striatus striatus Linnaeus, 1758 (synonyms: Conus subfloridus da Motta, 1985; Pionoconus striatus striatus (Linnaeus, 1758))

Description

The large, slim shell has a varying length between 44 mm and 129 mm. It is irregularly clouded with pink-white and chestnut or chocolate, with fine close revolving striae, forming the darker ground-color by close colored lines. The pointed spire is tessellated with chestnut or chocolate brown and white. Its shoulders are rounded and its sutures deep. The whorls are slightly channeled, carinate and striate. The outer lip shows a pronounced posterior flare.

Distribution
This species occurs in the Red Sea, in the Indian Ocean off the Aldabra Atoll, Madagascar, the Mascarene Basin, Mauritius and Tanzania; in the Pacific Ocean off the Philippines, Australia (Northern Territory, Queensland, Western Australia), New Zealand, New Caledonia and Thailand. It also occurs in Hawaiian islands.

References

 Linnaeus, C. (1758). Systema Naturae per regna tria naturae, secundum classes, ordines, genera, species, cum characteribus, differentiis, synonymis, locis. Editio decima, reformata. Laurentius Salvius: Holmiae. ii, 824 pp. 
 Lightfoot, J. 1786. A Catalogue of the Portland Museum, lately the property of the Duchess Dowager of Portland: deceased which will be sold by auction, by Mr. Skinner and Co., etc. London viii, 194 pp. + 44 pp. 
 Reeve, L.A. 1843. Monograph of the genus Conus. pls 1–39 in Reeve, L.A. (ed.). Conchologica Iconica. London : L. Reeve & Co. Vol. 1. 
 Sowerby, G.B. II 1857–1858. Monograph of the genus Conus. 1–56, pls 1–24 in Thesaurus conchyliorum or monographs of genera of shells. London : Sowerby Vol. 3.
 Hedley, C. 1899. The Mollusca of Funafuti. Part 1. Gastropoda. Memoirs of the Australian Museum 3(7): 395–488, 49 text figs
 Oostingh, C.H. 1925. Report on a collection of recent shells from Obi and Halmahera, Molluccas. Mededeelingen van de Landbouwhoogeschool te Wageningen 29(1): 1–362 [
 Demond, J. 1957. Micronesian reef associated gastropods. Pacific Science 11(3): 275–341, fig. 2, pl. 1
 Gillett, K. & McNeill, F. 1959. The Great Barrier Reef and Adjacent Isles: a comprehensive survey for visitor, naturalist and photographer. Sydney : Coral Press 209 pp.
 Wilson, B.R. & Gillett, K. 1971. Australian Shells: illustrating and describing 600 species of marine gastropods found in Australian waters. Sydney : Reed Books 168 pp. 
 Cernohorsky, W.O. 1978. Tropical Pacific Marine Shells. Sydney : Pacific Publications 352 pp., 68 pls. 
 Motta, A.J. da 1978. Six new Cone shells from Thailand (Gastropoda: Conidae). The Centre of Thai Natural Study 1978: 1–8
 Kay, E.A. 1979. Hawaiian Marine Shells. Reef and shore fauna of Hawaii. Section 4 : Mollusca. Honolulu, Hawaii : Bishop Museum Press Bernice P. Bishop Museum Special Publication Vol. 64(4) 653 pp.
 Motta, A.J. da 1985. Two new Conus species. La Conchiglia 17(190–191): 26–28 
 Jiménez-Tenorio,  A Revision of the Status of Several Conoid Taxa from the Hawaiian Islands
 Wilson, B. 1994. Australian Marine Shells. Prosobranch Gastropods. Kallaroo, WA : Odyssey Publishing Vol. 2 370 pp.
 Röckel, D., Korn, W. & Kohn, A.J. 1995. Manual of the Living Conidae. Volume 1: Indo-Pacific Region. Wiesbaden : Hemmen 517 pp.
 Filmer R.M. (2001). A Catalogue of Nomenclature and Taxonomy in the Living Conidae 1758 – 1998. Backhuys Publishers, Leiden. 388pp
 Tucker J.K. (2009). Recent cone species database. September 4, 2009 Edition
 Tucker J.K. & Tenorio M.J. (2009) Systematic classification of Recent and fossil conoidean gastropods. Hackenheim: Conchbooks. 296 pp.
 Puillandre N., Duda T.F., Meyer C., Olivera B.M. & Bouchet P. (2015). One, four or 100 genera? A new classification of the cone snails. Journal of Molluscan Studies. 81: 1–23

Gallery

External links
 The Conus Biodiversity website
 Gastropods.com: Pioconus striatus chusaki (f); accessed: 16 July 2011
 
Cone Shells – Knights of the Sea
 

striatus
Gastropods described in 1758
Taxa named by Carl Linnaeus